Justas Lasickas (born 6 October 1997) is a Lithuanian professional footballer who plays as a right-back or a winger for Slovenian PrvaLiga club Olimpija Ljubljana and the Lithuanian national team.

Club career 
Lasickas debuted with Žalgiris Vilnius in 2014. He had also played for Žalgiris Vilnius-2.

In summer 2017 he was loaned out to newly-promoted Serbian SuperLiga side Zemun. He debuted in the 2017–18 Serbian SuperLiga on 5 August 2017, in a game against Radnički Niš. Lasickas scored his first SuperLiga goal in the seventh round, in a home game against Bačka on 26 August 2017.

After playing with Jagiellonia Białystok in Poland for one season, he returned to Serbia in June 2019 and signed with Voždovac.

In May 2022, Lasickas joined Slovenian PrvaLiga side Olimpija Ljubljana. He made his league debut for Olimpija on 24 July 2022 against Tabor Sežana in a 1–0 away win.

International career 
Lasickas represented Lithuania at under-19 and under-21 levels.

In March 2018, he received a call from the senior team for their friendly matches against Georgia and Armenia. He debuted for Lithuania on 24 March in the match against Georgia.

International goals
Scores and results list Lithuania's goal tally first, score column indicates score after each Lasickas goal.

Honours 
Žalgiris Vilnius
A Lyga: 2014, 2015, 2016
Lithuanian Cup: 2015–16, 2016
Lithuanian Supercup: 2016

References 

1997 births
Living people
Footballers from Vilnius
Lithuanian footballers
Lithuania youth international footballers
Lithuania under-21 international footballers
Lithuania international footballers
Association football fullbacks
Association football wingers
FK Žalgiris players
FK Zemun players
Jagiellonia Białystok players
FK Voždovac players
NK Olimpija Ljubljana (2005) players
A Lyga players
I Lyga players
Serbian SuperLiga players
Ekstraklasa players
Slovenian PrvaLiga players
Lithuanian expatriate footballers
Lithuanian expatriate sportspeople in Serbia
Lithuanian expatriate sportspeople in Poland
Lithuanian expatriate sportspeople in Slovenia
Expatriate footballers in Serbia
Expatriate footballers in Poland
Expatriate footballers in Slovenia